Long Way Back to the Moon is the seventh studio album from heavy metal band, Galactic Cowboys. It was released on November 17, 2017 through Mascot Label Group, as their comeback release after a seventeen year hiatus.

Background 

In 2015, bass player Monty Colvin was contacted by Jim Pitulski, an A&R for Mascot Records, who offered a contract in return for the band's reunion. Within a year, the band with its original lineup had regrouped and began working on new music. The album was written and recorded in Houston and Kansas City in early 2016, however, the opening track, "In the Clouds", was actually written in 1989 by Doss and Colvin, as the first song the band ever wrote.

Track listing

Personnel 

 Ben Huggins – vocals, guitar
 Dane Sonnier – vocals, guitars
 Monty Colvin – vocals, bass
 Alan Doss – vocals, drums

References 

2017 albums
Galactic Cowboys albums